The Crossing of the Red Land - the saga of Jewish refugees in Brazil (orig. title in Portuguese: A Travessia da Terra Vermelha – uma saga dos refugiados judeus no Brasil), is a 2007 novel by Brazilian author Lucius de Mello.

This historical novel details the lives of German Jewish refugees in the 1930s and 1940s, who found themselves living in the wilderness of Paraná, in Southern Brazil, while escaping Hitler's regime. 
 
To compose this romance, the author interviewed direct descendants of these pioneers, in Brazil and in Germany.

nova edição:
http://editoranacional.com.br/

video sobre o livro:
https://www.youtube.com/watch?v=7a5dhNEQ4uo
Beatriz Segall e A "Lista de Schindler" do Brasil. 
Book trailer com participação especial da atriz Beatriz Segall.
Um book trailer sobre o livro que conta a história real das famílias judaicas salvas do horror nazista pela construção de uma ferrovia brasileira. 
Brazilian "Schindler´s List".
Real story of an escape plan that secured dozens of Jewish families to cross into the Brazilian backwoods during the Nazi horror in Germany.
jews #judeus #shoah #segundaguerramundial #ferrovia #atravessiadaterravermelha #beatrizsegall #luciusdemello 
secondwar #holocausto #Rolandia #crossingtheredland #alemanha

External links
Synopsis and cover from the publisher, Novo Século (in Portuguese)

2007 novels
Brazilian historical novels
Fiction set in the 1930s
Fiction set in the 1940s
Jewish Brazilian history
Jewish emigration from Nazi Germany
Novels set in Brazil
Paraná (state)